Phil Woods and his European Rhythm Machine at the Frankfurt Jazz Festival is a 1970 album by Phil Woods, produced by Horst Lippmann.

Reception

Scott Yanow reviewed the album for Allmusic and wrote that "Woods' longtime bebop fans may not be that excited by these pretty free improvisations (although the musicians were clearly listening closely to each other), but the altoist's tone remained quite recognizable. Challenging and stimulating music".

Track listing 
 "Freedom Jazz Dance" (Eddie Harris) – 13:30
 "Ode A Jean Louis" (Phil Woods) – 13:30
 "Josua" (Victor Feldman) – 13:00
 "The Meeting" (Gordon Beck) – 11:00

Personnel 
Phil Woods – alto saxophone
Gordon Beck – piano
Henri Texier – double bass
Daniel Humair – drums
Haig Adishian – album design
Herbie Mann – executive producer
Giuseppe G. Pino – black and white photography
Marc Riboud – colour photography
Horst Lippmann – producer

References

1969 live albums
Albums produced by Horst Lippmann
Phil Woods live albums
Embryo Records live albums
Instrumental albums